John Michael Wright (born 25 September 1946) is an English former professional footballer who made 282 appearances in the Football League playing as a right back for Aston Villa. Wright started his career at Ellesmere Port Grammar School and Ellesmere Port F.C. His career was cut short when he had to retire through injury.

References

1946 births
Living people
People from Ellesmere Port
English footballers
Association football defenders
Ellesmere Port Town F.C. players
Aston Villa F.C. players
Sportspeople from Cheshire